Volleyball at the 1988 Summer Paralympics in Seoul consisted of standing and sitting volleyball events for men.

Medal summary

Medal table

Men's standing volleyball team rosters 
Source: International Paralympic Committee

Men's sitting volleyball team rosters 
Source: International Paralympic Committee

References 

 

1988 Summer Paralympics events
1988
Paralympics